Christoph Leitgeb (born 14 April 1985) is an Austrian former professional footballer who played as a midfielder. Leitgeb has represented his country at international level, earning 41 caps, and took part in Euro 2008.

Club career
Born in Graz, Leitgeb began his career in the youth squad of Sturm Graz spending two years there before moving into the first squad during the 2005/06 season. Leitgeb spent two years in the first team before moving to league rivals Red Bull Salzburg in the summer of 2007 for a fee of 1.7 million euros. On 4 August 2020 Leitgeb announced his retirement.

International career
Leitgeb made his debut for Austria on 23 June 2006 in a friendly against Croatia and was a participant at Euro 2008 and played two out of three matches for Austria.

Career statistics

Honours
Red Bull Salzburg
Austrian Football Bundesliga: 2008–09, 2009–10, 2011–12, 2013–14, 2014–15, 2015–16
Austrian Cup: 2011–12, 2013–14, 2014–15, 2015–16

References

External links
 Player profile – Red Bull Salzburg
 
 
 

1985 births
Living people
Footballers from Graz
Austrian footballers
Austria international footballers
UEFA Euro 2008 players
SK Sturm Graz players
FC Red Bull Salzburg players
Austrian Football Bundesliga players
Association football forwards